The 2020 International Maturidi Conference was an international scientific-practical conference, sponsored by the President of Uzbekistan Shavkat Mirziyoyev, held over three days, from 3 to 5 March 2020, in the city of Samarkand under the title of "Imam Abu Mansur Maturidi and the Teachings of Maturidiyya: The Past and the Present".

The conference was organized jointly with the Committee on Religious Affairs under the Cabinet of Ministers of the Republic of Uzbekistan, the Imam Bukhari International Scientific Research Center (IBISRC), the Center for Islamic Civilization, the Muslims Board of Uzbekistan, the International Islamic Academy of Uzbekistan, and the Egyptian Al-Azhar Complex.

The main purpose of the conference is to further study of Imam Maturidi's scientific heritage, to reveal the essence of the teachings of Maturidiyya against destructive sects, throughout the world promotion of the invaluable contribution to Islamic civilization of Uzbekistan as the "Country of Great Scholars", and shedding light on the scientific and civilizational legacy of scholars from Transoxiana.

The participants at the conference discussed some issues related to Islam and Muslims, such as:
 Teachings of Maturidiyya and modernity.
 Preservation and development of religious values in the modern state.

Participants 
The conference witnessed the participation of delegations representing many Islamic bodies and scientific universities, as well as scholars from Uzbekistan, and over 70 scholars and thinkers from the al-Azhar, as well as scholars of the Council of Senior Scholars, Muslim Council of Elders, and the Bulgarian Islamic Academy. In addition, it was attended by scholars, religious leaders, and directors of scientific and research centres from over 20 countries, including Algeria, Jordan, Indonesia, Malaysia, Turkey, Pakistan, Bosnia Herzegovina, Kazakhstan, Kyrgyzstan, Russia, Ukraine, Switzerland, Germany, and United Kingdom.

Among the prominent scholars who participated were:
 Usmankhan Alimov (Grand Mufti of Uzbekistan)
 Ahmad el-Tayyeb (Grand Imam of Al-Azhar)
 Tariq Sha'ban (Director of Al-Azhar Observatory for Countering Extremism)
 Muhammad Rafi' 'Usmani (President of Darul Uloom Karachi)
 Albir Krganov (Mufti of the Spiritual Assembly of Muslims of the Russian Federation)
 Ahmad Tamim (Mufti of Ukraine)
 Sa'id Foudah (Leading Kalam scholar from Jordan)
 Sönmez Kutlu (professor at the Faculty of Religious Studies of Ankara University)
 Hureyre Kam (Professor of Islamic Studies / Islamic theology at the University of Hamburg)
 Mohd Yusof Othman (Director of the Institute of Islamic Civilization in Malaysia)
 Mohd Farid Mohd Shahran (Director, Centre of the Study of Shari'ah, Law and Politics, Institute of Islamic Understanding Malaysia)
 Kamaluddin Nurdin Marjuni (Associate Professor in Department of Akidah and Religion Studies, Universiti Sains Islam Malaysia)
 Rafik Mukhametshin (Rector of the Russian Islamic University, Deputy Chairman of the Spiritual administration of Muslims of the Republic of Tatarstan)
 Ramil Adigamov, Head of Department of Arabic Language at Kazan Islamic University.
 Zaylabidin Azhimamatov, Doctor of Theological Sciences of the Osh State University.

Conference recommendations 
The conference came out with a set of recommendations, most importantly:
 Establishing a memorial complex for Imam al-Maturidi, according to the traditions of the national architecture in Samarkand.
 Preparing commentaries and glosses on his books, such as: "Kitab al-Tawhid", and "Kitab Ta'wilat al-Qur'an" or "Ta'wilat Ahl al-Sunnah", known also as "Tafsir al-Maturidi".
 Collecting and preserving electronic copies of the literature of al-Maturidi and the Maturidi scholars, such as al-Nasafi – author of "Tabsirat al-Adillah".
 Organizing a competition for the researchers of the Maturidi's heritage in Al-Azhar and choosing its winners.
 Holding a periodic scientific forum for the contributions of al-Maturidi to the Islamic civilization and Muslim cultures.
 Searching for other aspects of accepting others in the heritage of Maturidi and publishing it.
 The necessity of teaching the theory of knowledge (epistemology).
 Teaching and spreading al-Maturidi's dogmas and simplifying them for students against extremism and radicalism in the world.
 Creating a special website where information about scientific heritage of Imam al-Maturidi and teachings of Maturidiyya will be posted.

See also 
 Imam Maturidi International Scientific Research Center
 2016 international conference on Sunni Islam in Grozny
 List of Ash'aris and Maturidis

References

External links 
 Samarkand awards Tayyeb title of honorary citizen — State Information Service
 “Imam Abu Mansur Maturidi and the Teaching of Maturidiyya: The Past and the Present” — Al-Furqan Islamic Heritage Foundation

2020 in Uzbekistan
2020 conferences
Academic conferences
Islamic conferences
International conferences in Uzbekistan
Maturidi
Samarkand
Shavkat Mirziyoev
Sunni Islam